Fernseea itatiaiae is a species of flowering plant in the Bromeliaceae family. The bromeliad is endemic to the Atlantic Forest biome (Mata Atlantica Brasileira), located in southeastern Brazil.  It is native within Minas Gerais, Rio de Janeiro (state), and São Paulo (state).

References

itatiaiae
Endemic flora of Brazil
Flora of the Atlantic Forest
Flora of Minas Gerais
Flora of Rio de Janeiro (state)
Flora of São Paulo (state)
Taxa named by John Gilbert Baker
Taxa named by Heinrich Wawra von Fernsee